Keast's tube-nosed fruit bat (Nyctimene keasti) is a species of megabat in the family Pteropodidae found in Babar, Tanimbar, and the Kai Islands. It was named after Colin Keast.

Description 
Keast's tube-nosed fruit bat is a species in the genus Nyctimene, which includes bats that have prominent nostrils splaying out in opposite directions. The pelage of the species is gender dimorphic, males are notably darker and fawn-coloured, females are predominantly buff-yellow lightened by a drab colour at the base of the hair.

Taxonomy 
The taxon was first described as a subspecies of Nyctimene albiventer in 1993. A review of the systematics two years later elevated the status of the group to species and distinguished island populations previously described as Nyctimene cephalotes. The holotype was collected in 1992 in a mist net, close to sea level, at the edge of forest near a lake, on an island in the Maluku (province). The epithet of the species refers to an honorary assistant at the Western Australian Museum, Colin Keast, who assisted in the preparation of the specimen's skulls.

References

D.E. Wilson & D.M. Reeder, 2005: Mammal Species of the World: A Taxonomic and Geographic Reference. Third Edition. The Johns Hopkins University Press, Baltimore

Nyctimene (genus)
Mammals described in 1993
Taxa named by Darrell Kitchener
Bats of Southeast Asia